MultitrackStudio is a digital audio workstation application for macOS (OS X), Windows and iPad platforms.

It is developed and maintained by a small company (Bremmers Audio Design, The Netherlands) led by Giel Bremmers.

This software can be used for any musical genre and its main key aspect is the simple and original user interface,
while enabling powerful and flexible features often not found even in more popular and expensive products.

Features 
In spite of its moderate pricing, MultitrackStudio has most of the features of a standard full DAW: 
audio/MIDI recording, MIDI sequencing, mixing, audio effects, variable time signatures, multi MIDI editing, MIDI streams, automation, control surfaces, remote control, etc.
Stock instruments have limited quality, but they can be easily replaced with free or commercial VST and AU plugins.
The Mac version also integrates a Soundfont Player.

Versions 
The desktop version is available under three options: 
Lite (free of charge, limited to 3 tracks) 
Standard (paid, almost all features and no track limit)
Pro (paid, with additional advanced features)

See also 
Comparison of digital audio editors
Comparison of MIDI editors and sequencers
List of music software
Multitrack recording
Music sequencer
Music Workstation

References 

 " New iPad DAW MultitrackStudio Hits The App Store", MusicRadar, January 2014.
 " Bremmers Audio Design Updates MultitrackStudio To V8.0", Rekkerd.org, March 2015.

External links 
 MultitrackStudio, official website.

Music sequencers
Digital audio workstation software